The 1961 Colorado State Rams football team represented Colorado State University in the Skyline Conference during the 1961 NCAA University Division football season.  In their sixth and final season under head coach Don Mullison, the Rams compiled a 0–10 record (0–6 against Skyline opponents), finished last in the Skyline Conference, and were outscored by a total of 249 to 74.

The team's statistical leaders included LeeRoy Gutierrez with 387 passing yards, Dennis Wohlhueter with 308 rushing yards, and Kay McFarland with 196 receiving yards.

The Skyline Conference disbanded after the 1961 season, and Colorado State became an independent for the 1962 season.

Schedule

References

Colorado State
Colorado State Rams football seasons
Colorado State Rams football